Looney Tunes: Cartoon Conductor (known as Looney Tunes: Cartoon Concerto in Europe and Australia) is a Nintendo DS game developed by Amaze Entertainment and published by Eidos Interactive.

Plot 
The game starts with Bugs Bunny standing in front of a stage. Bugs explains that the Tasmanian Devil destroyed the classical music in some old Looney Tunes and Merrie Melodies cartoons, so it's up to the player to conduct a new orchestra to refill the Looney Tunes cartoon background music. Bugs then will teach the player about how to conduct the orchestra.

Gameplay 
Players must conduct an orchestra to perform at a classic Looney Tunes cartoon. To start the orchestra, players must tap three times on the touch screen, like a real conductor. To make the orchestra perform perfectly, players must tap or drag the notes at the right times; if not the performance meter will go down. If the performance meter depletes completely, the orchestra will be canceled and the game will end. There are four difficulties: Apprentice (easy), Conductor (normal), Maestro (hard), and a fourth, unlockable mode and the hardest one: Looney. This mode is about as hard as Maestro mode, but unlike the other difficulties, the player must play through the intervals instead of just watching them.

Each time the player taps or drags a note, the player will gain a varying number of points. The number of points depends on the player's accuracy. There are four accuracy levels in the game: Gold, Silver, Normal, and Miss. The score level, scores, and combos also affects the performance meter, the audience, the cartoon, and the musical grade. There are five musical grades: S+, S, A, B and C. The musical grade can be guessed by the amount of applause when the cartoon ends.

Track list

Voice cast 
 Joe Alaskey as Bugs Bunny, Daffy Duck, Sylvester the Cat, Speedy Gonzales, Barnyard Dawg, and Marvin the Martian
 Bob Bergen as Porky Pig and Tweety Bird
 Jim Cummings as Taz
 Bill Farmer as Foghorn Leghorn and Mouse
 Maurice LaMarche as Wile E. Coyote and Yosemite Sam
 Billy West as Elmer Fudd

Reception 

Cartoon Conductor received "average" reviews according to the review aggregation website Metacritic.

References

External links
 

2008 video games
Music video games
Nintendo DS games
Nintendo DS-only games
Video games featuring Bugs Bunny
Video games featuring Daffy Duck
Video games featuring Sylvester the Cat
Video games featuring the Tasmanian Devil (Looney Tunes)
Video games developed in the United States
Warner Bros. video games
Cartoon Network video games
Amaze Entertainment games
Single-player video games
Eidos Interactive games